Chadwicks is a census-designated place in the town of New Hartford in Oneida County, New York, United States. Chadwicks is part of the Utica–Rome Metropolitan Statistical Area.

Currently, residents of Chadwicks attend local schooling from the nearby hamlet of Sauquoit.

Demographics

References

Census-designated places in Oneida County, New York
Census-designated places in New York (state)
Utica–Rome metropolitan area